Iowa State University's Debbie and Jerry Ivy College of Business was established in 1984, and is accredited by AACSB International – The Association to Advance Collegiate Schools of Business. The college consists of five departments offering nine bachelor's degrees and six post graduate degrees.

History 

Although Iowa State University had offered courses in business since the 1920s, the College of Business was only established in 1984. In the 1920s, business courses were held under the Department of Economics. After some name changes, the Department of Industrial Administration was created in 1955, and became a part of the College of Humanities and Sciences in 1958. In 1980, the School of Business Administration was formed which was renamed the College of Business Administration in 1984. The college was renamed to the College of Business in 1991. On October 19, 2017 the college was officially renamed the Debbie and Jerry Ivy College of Business.

Academics

Departments
Accounting
Finance
Management
Marketing
Supply Chain
Information Systems

Centers 
Iowa Small Business Development Center
ISU Pappajohn Center for Entrepreneurship

Facilities 
The Gerdin Business Building located on the Iowa State University Campus is the home of the College of Business. Completed in 2003, the building is named after Russell and Ann Gerdin, the lead donors for the construction of the new business building.

References

External links 
Iowa State University College of Business

Business
1984 establishments in Iowa
 Business schools in Iowa